Bali Qutubpur or Balli Qutabpur is a village in Sonipat district, Haryana, India.

References

Villages in Sonipat district